Emma Ray Riggs McKay (June 23, 1877 – November 14, 1970) was a humanitarian, music patron, and the wife of David O. McKay, president of the Church of Jesus Christ of Latter-day Saints (LDS Church) from 1951 to 1970, with whom she traveled the world engaged in charitable and religious work.

Education 
Known as "Ray" throughout her life, McKay was born Emma Ray Riggs in Salt Lake City, Utah Territory.  She attended the Cincinnati Conservatory of Music to study piano performance. After returning to Utah, she was one of six students to be awarded degrees from the University of Utah in 1898 where she had attended the Department of Music. Both her parents, Emma Louise Robbins and Obadiah H. Riggs, taught at the University.

Marriage and Family Life 
While teaching at Madison Elementary School in Ogden, Utah, David O. McKay proposed marriage to her. They were married on January 2, 1901 in Salt Lake City and had seven children together, one of whom died in infancy. As David O. McKay served as the mission president for European Great Britain, she was set apart as a mission president's wife from November 3, 1922 to December 20, 1924. She traveled with and supported David O. McKay as he served as President of the Church of Jesus Christ of Latter-day Saints. On November 14, 1970, Emma McKay died.

The McKay Music Library at the University of Utah is named in her honor.

Recognitions
 Utah Mother of the Year Award
 honorary doctorate in humanities from Utah Agricultural College
 Distinguished Achievement Award from Ricks College
 Outstanding Woman Award from Brigham Young University
 Eternal Quest of Womanhood Award from Utah State University

References

Further reading 
 Hartshorn, Leon R. Remarkable Stories from the Lives of Latter-Day Saint Women. Vol. 1, Spring Creek Book Co., 2006.

1877 births
1970 deaths
People from Salt Lake City
Latter Day Saints from Ohio
Burials at Salt Lake City Cemetery
McKay family
University of Cincinnati – College-Conservatory of Music alumni
University of Utah alumni
Latter Day Saints from Utah